Kafr Tahla is a village located in Qalyubia Governorate, Egypt. It is the birthplace of feminist Nawal El Saadawi.

The older name of the village is Bakha.

References

Populated places in Qalyubiyya Governorate